"Get Well Soon" (stylized in all lowercase) is a song by American singer Ariana Grande, who co-wrote the song with its producer Pharrell Williams. It is the final track on Grande's fourth studio album Sweetener (2018). It is inspired by Grande's personal anxiety and post-traumatic stress disorder following the May 2017 terrorist attack after her concert in Manchester, United Kingdom.

Background
Grande first teased the song in an Instagram post on December 31, 2017. Following the European leg of Dangerous Woman Tour and the terrorist attack at a Manchester show, Grande revealed that she had "really wild dizzy spells, this feeling like I couldn't breathe", and that she "felt so upside down" and her anxiety became physical. She shared her experience with Pharrell Williams, with whom she created the song. In a later interview for Paper, Grande said: "[Pharrell] kind of forced it out of me, because I was in a really bad place mentally. ... [Pharrell] was like, 'You have to write about it. You need to make this into music and get this shit out, and I promise it will heal you.' And it definitely helped." She also said that the song is "probably one of the most important songs [she would] ever write." Grande revealed in an interview on Beats 1 Radio that she intended the song to offer a "musical hug". She further explained that "Get Well Soon" is about "being there for each other and helping each other through scary times and anxiety" and about "personal demons and anxiety and more intimate tragedies as well", stressing that mental health is very important.

Recording and composition
Grande recorded "Get Well Soon" at Chalice Recording Studios in Hollywood, California. Pharrell Williams and Ariana Grande co-wrote the song, and Williams produced it. It is a soul and gospel ballad that runs for five minutes and twenty-two seconds. The singer's vocals are stacked (layered); Grande intended them to represent "all the voices in [her] head talking to one another". In Grande's Time magazine Next Generation Leaders interview, her vocals are described as being "interwoven in dense layers of sound, creating an otherworldly effect".

At the end of the track, 40 seconds of silence are played, making the song five minutes and twenty-two seconds long. Some listeners speculate the song, and its length, are the date of the Manchester Arena bombing, which took place on May 22, 2017 (5/22).

Critical reception
"Get Well Soon" has received widespread acclaim from music critics, who have lauded it as one of Grande's best-written songs. Pitchfork editor Jillian Mapes called "Get Well Soon" a "career-defining moment" and praised it as "the sort of freeform, self-help soul ballad you'd maybe expect to round out a Beyoncé opus" and wrote: "Anyone who knows how gracefully Grande handled the horrific events at her Manchester show last year will recognize an equally graceful response to her own emotional aftermath in this song." The Independents Kate Solomon described the track as ambitious and said: "As a five-minute musical interpretation of the post-traumatic panic attacks Grande has suffered, 'Get Well Soon' is not exactly enjoyable to listen to but admirable in its honesty." Chris Willman described Grande's singing as florid and Neil McCormick wrote that she sounded like "a one-woman doo-wop combo". Paper "Top 100 Songs of 2018" ranked the song at #15, commending Grande for "[doing] something she didn't have to" by "[transforming] her pain into something digestible, like sweetener molecules settling into a bitter cup of coffee."

Live performances 
Grande performed the song for the first time while on her promotional tour The Sweetener Sessions. She also performed it in the special Ariana Grande at the BBC. During the Sweetener World Tour, she originally omitted it from the setlist because according to her, the song was not designed to be performed in a big concert and instead just for small venues like The Sweetener Sessions. However, starting with the show in Phoenix on May 14, 2019, "Goodnight n Go" was replaced with a shortened version of "Get Well Soon".

Credits and personnel
Credits and personnel adapted from the liner notes of Sweetener.

Recording and management
Recorded at Chalice Recording Studios (Hollywood, California) for I Am Other Entertainment
Mixed at Callanwolde Fine Arts Center (Atlanta, Georgia)
Mastered at Sterling Sound (New York City)
Published by EMI Pop Music Publishing/More Water from Nazareth (GMR), Universal Music Group Corp. (ASCAP)/GrandAriMusic (ASCAP)

Personnel
Ariana Grande – songwriting, vocals, vocal production
Pharrell Williams – songwriting, vocals, record producer
Phil Tan – mixing
Bill Zimmermann – additional mix engineering
Randy Merrill – mastering
Mike Larson – recording, digital editing and arrangement for I Am Other Entertainment
Thomas Cullison – recording assistantance

Charts

References

External links
 
 Best Get Well Soon Message

2018 songs
Ariana Grande songs
Song recordings produced by Pharrell Williams
Songs written by Pharrell Williams
Songs written by Ariana Grande